Vladimir Porfirevich Polyakov (5 March 1931 – 16 June 2002) was a Soviet diplomat who served as Soviet ambassador to Egypt as well as Soviet Vice-Minister of Foreign Affairs.

He served as Soviet Ambassador to Egypt from 1974 until he was expelled by Egyptian President Anwar Sadat in September 1981. In 1983-1990 he served as head of the Middle East section of the Soviet Ministry of Foreign Affairs.

References

1931 births
2002 deaths
Ambassador Extraordinary and Plenipotentiary (Soviet Union)
Ambassadors of the Soviet Union to Sudan
Ambassadors of the Soviet Union to Egypt
Ambassadors of the Soviet Union to South Yemen
Ambassadors of Russia to Egypt
Recipients of the Order of Friendship of Peoples